Home plate is a baseball term for the final base that a player must touch to score.

Home plate may also refer to:

 Home Plate (Mars), a geologic feature on Mars observed by the Spirit rover
 Home Plate (album), a 1975 album by Bonnie Raitt
 Home Plate Farm, a historic building in Sudbury, Massachusetts, U.S.
 MLB Home Plate, now MLB Network Radio, a satellite radio station

See also
Home Place (disambiguation)